Ladislav Izsák (Hungarian: Izsak Lászlo, born 13 October 1954) is a retired Hungarian football player. He played as a central defender or defensive midfielder and spent the majority of his playing career at FC Bihor Oradea. He would also spend time playing in Greece and Israel as well as Canada after his family's immigration to Vancouver in the 1970s.

Youth career
Growing up playing for the famous youth program at Bihor Oradea he would play alongside future stars such as Zoltan Crișan, Attila Kun and Alexandru Sătmăreanu. He would eventually make his senior debut in 1968.

Professional career
He would spend the next 4 years of his career with Bihor Oradea before eventually immigrating to Greece where he would join 2nd Division side Apollon Smyrni. Registering just 5 start and no goals.

In the summer of 1973 he would leave on a free transfer to Liga Leumit side Hapoel Daliyat registering 2 goals in 9 starts.

In 1974 his family would immigrate to Vancouver, British Columbia, Canada where he would join semi-professional side Richmond Brighouse choosing to retire at the end of the 1977 season.

Personal life
Currently resides in Vancouver, BC with his wife and son Robert Izsak.

References

Hungarian footballers
1954 births
Living people
FC Bihor Oradea players
Association football midfielders